The Agence de financement des infrastructures de transport de France (AFITF) is an établissement public administratif national (EDAN) whose goal is to fund transport projects in France.

Starting from 2013, the AFITF will receive a part of the incomes generated by the taxe poids lourds.

Creation 

It was created by a  dated 26 November 2004.

Projects funded

2009 
 Construction of the A19 autoroute
 Construction of the Ligne du Haut-Bugey
 Construction of the LGV Rhin-Rhône
 Studies for the second phase of the LGV Est

References 

Transport in France